Anioł Dowgird (1776–1835) was a philosopher of Polish Enlightenment and Lithuanian Enlightenment.

Dowgird studied in Jesuit and Piarist schools, then joined the Piarist Order and took holy orders. Subsequently, he taught at Piarist schools and for a time was a professor of logic and ethics at Vilnius University.

Dowgird derived his views from John Locke's empiricism, the Scottish School of Common Sense, and Immanuel Kant's Critique of Pure Reason. But, unlike Kant, he ascribed to time and space a real existence independent of man.

Works
O logice, metafizyce i filozofji moralnej (On Logic, Metaphysics and Moral Philosophy)
Wykład przyrodzonych myślenia prawideł, czyli logika teoretyczna i praktyczna (A Treatise on the Natural Laws of Thought, or Theoretical and Practical Logic)
Rezczywistość poznań ludzkich (The Reality of Human Experience)

He also wrote several sermons and left a manuscript treatise on Kant's philosophy.

See also
History of philosophy in Poland

References

1776 births
1835 deaths
19th-century Polish philosophers
Belarusian philosophers
Academic staff of Vilnius University
18th-century Polish–Lithuanian philosophers